Mr. Jinx or Mr. Jinks can mean:
Mr. Jinks, cat from the cartoon Pixie & Dixie and Mr. Jinks, part of Huckleberry Hound|The Huckleberry Hound Show.
Mr Jinks, racehorse
Mr. Jinx, cat from the movie Meet the Parents and subsequent sequels.
"Mr. Jinx", song by Quarashi.
Mr. Jinx, alien crewman from the webcomic Starslip Crisis.
Mr. Jinks Buys a Dress, 1913 film.

See also
Jinx